GIK may refer to:

 Gik, Iran
 Ghulam Ishaq Khan (1915–2006), former president of Pakistan
 Ghulam Ishaq Khan Institute of Engineering Sciences and Technology, a renowned private engineering institute in Khyber Pakhtunkhwa, Pakistan
 Gifts in kind
 Great Invention Kit